The Society of the Sacred Advent is an Anglican religious order founded at Brisbane, Queensland, Australia, in 1892 by Caroline Amy Balguy (1833-1915), and still active in that city.

History
Known as Sister Caroline Amy and, later, Mother Caroline, Caroline Amy Balguy started her religious life at the Community of St John Baptist in Clewer, England. She came to Australia on 9 December 1892 at the request of the Reverend Montagu John Stone-Wigg, Vicar and Canon Residentiary of St John’s Pro-Cathedral, who saw the need for an Anglican religious order for women in Brisbane.

In its early days the Society of the Sacred Advent focused on ministering to the needs of women and children, establishing several schools and children’s homes throughout Queensland. In 1895 the Sisters opened a boarding school for girls in Nundah, at the site of a former boys' school, known as Eton High School. On 8 July 1910, under the guidance of Mother Emma Crawford, the Sisters moved into their current residence at Community House in Albion.

Character
As expressed on the Anglican Religious Communities website, The Society of the Sacred Advent exists "for the glory of God and for the service of His Church in preparation for the Second Coming of our Lord and Saviour Jesus Christ". To this end, the Sisters devote themselves to God in community under vows of poverty, chastity and obedience, leading a life of prayer, silence and work. The Sisters' aim is "to point the way to Jesus in our own time, to a world which has largely lost touch with spiritual realities and is caught up in despair, loneliness and fear". The patron saint of the order is St John the Baptist.

Current life and work
The Society has two schools located in Brisbane, Australia - St Margaret's and St Aidan's; both are for girls only. Although the Sisters are no longer involved in the day-to-day running of the schools, two Sisters remain active on each of the School Councils. The Sisters also conduct regular quiet days and retreats which are open to members of the public. Attendees can enjoy a day of quiet prayer in the Sister's Chapel and the beautiful gardens surrounding Community House. A traditional labyrinth is also available for use. Details for quiet days and retreats may be found in 'Focus', the newspaper of the Anglican Diocese of Brisbane.

In recent years, the Society has received two new vocations; Sister Rosalind Miriam was admitted as a novice in 2007, and Sister Moira Grace in 2006. Sister Moira has since taken full vows at a ceremony held in the Sister's Chapel on 26 February 2008; and Sister Rosalind Miriam most recently on 2 February 2010. On 11 July 2010, the Sisters also celebrated 100 years in their current residence, Community House.

In 2017, the Sisters celebrated 125 years since the establishment of their Society. Of the approximately 80 women who joined the order, only 3 sisters remain, living in semi-retirement. The Society still owns St Margaret's and St Aidan's schools in Brisbane. Other schools established by the order are now managed by the relevant Anglican diocese.

Notable members 
 Emma Crawford

References

Further reading

External links
 A Short Biography of Mother Emma SSA
 The History of St Margaret's Anglican Girls' School
 St Margaret's School Council (containing some information about and a photo of Sister Gillian SSA)
 Photos of The National Aboriginal and Torres Strait Islander Anglican Council 2006 taken at the SSA Community House, Brisbane
 Home Truths (a theological article written by Sister Gillian SSA)

Anglican orders and communities
Religious organizations established in 1892
Christian religious orders established in the 19th century
Anglican organizations established in the 19th century